Anshul Jubli (born 13 January 1995) is an Indian mixed martial artist from Dehradun, Uttarakhand who currently signed to the lightweight division of Ultimate Fighting Championship, where he became the second person from India after Bharat Kandare, to get an UFC contract, as well as first person from India to win an UFC match.

Background
Jubli is the native of Bhatwari, near Uttarkashi in Uttarakhand state of India. His father was employed in Border Security Force (BSF), due to his father's transfers he spent his childhood in various states of India. Finally his family settled down in Dehradun. To get a job in Indian Army he began preparation for Combined Defense Service (CDS) and Services Selection Board (SSB)'s examination. In between 2015 he started watching MMA through various media, after his friend's brother showed it to him. He's received a bachelor of science degree in mathematics from the Hemwati Nandan Bahuguna Garhwal University and worked as a school teacher before turning to mixed martial arts.

In 2017, when he was doing preparation for recruitment examination of Indian Army, he discovered MMA on YouTube. He watched videos of Firas Zahabi, a MMA teacher as well as Brazilian jiu-jitsu (BJJ) and MMA instructor, John Danaher, following watching the videos Jubli and his friend used to reenact the moves and learn. His hometown Dehradun had no training, coaching facilities so he joined Crosstrain Fight Club in Delhi, an MMA club under Siddharth Singh. Here he learnt ground game and worked on his strength and conditioning under Deepak Karai, and how to bring it all together for the sport of MMA. He learnt boxing at Tokas Boxing Club under Rohit Tokas, an amateur boxer. He joined MMA promotion Matrix Fight Night (MFN), founded by Bollywood actor Tiger Shroff.

Mixed martial arts career
In 2019, he debuted in professional MMA at Matrix Fight Night (MFN), a MMA promotion founded by Bollywood actor Tiger Shroff. In his first fight on 29 June 2019, he won against Sanjeet Budhwar by decision at Mumbai. On 20 December he defeated Amit Raj Kumar by judges decision. On 28 February 2020, he won against Rajith Chandran by TKO in 4:44 of round one at Dubai, in same year on 15 December he defeated Srikant Shekhar by decision after 3 round fight at Dubai and at 24 September defeated Mohammad Mahmoudian in round 1. He learnt boxing at Tokas Boxing Club under Rohit Tokas, an amateur boxer.

Road to UFC 
In 2022, He entered the Road to UFC Lightweight Tournament and in his first scheduled match against Patrick Sho Usami, he progressed to the next round through bye because the opponent missed weight cut and UFC was not able to find replacement for him.

In the semi-finals, he defeated South Korean Kyung Pyo Kim in semi-finals by split decision. Jubli went on to win the tournament by defeating Jeka Saragih of Indonesia in final with a knockout at UFC Fight Night: Lewis vs. Spivak. This match won him the Performance of the Night and he was awarded US$ 50,000 along with the full contract in the UFC lightweight division. He is the second fighter from India who got an UFC contract, previously Bharat Kandare have signed a contract to UFC.

Championships and accomplishments  
Ultimate Fighting Championship
Performance of the Night (one time) 
2022 Road to UFC Lightweight Tournament Winner

Mixed martial arts record

|-
|Win
|align=center|7–0
|Jeka Saragih
|TKO (punches and elbows)
|UFC Fight Night: Lewis vs. Spivak
|
|align=center|2
|align=center|3:44 
|Las Vegas, Nevada, United States
|
|-
|Win
|align=center|6–0
|Kyung Pyo Kim
|Decision (split)
|Road to UFC: Episode 6
|
|align=center|3
|align=center|5:00
|Abu Dhabi, United Arab Emirates
|
|-
|Win
|align=center|5–0
|Mohammad Mahmoudian
|Submission (arm-triangle-choke)
|Matrix Fight Night 6
|
|align=center|1
|align=center|2:17
|Dubai, United Arab Emirates
|  
|-
|Win
|align=center|4–0
|Srikant Sekhar
|Decision (unanimous)
|Matrix Fight Night 5
|
|align=center|3
|align=center|5:00
|Dubai, United Arab Emirates
|
|-
|Win
|align=center|3–0
|Rajith Chandran
|TKO (punches)
|Matrix Fight Night 4
|
|align=center|1
|align=center|4:44
|Dubai, United Arab Emirates
|
|-
|Win
|align=center|2–0
|Amit Raj Kumar
|Decision (unanimous)
|Matrix Fight Night 3
|
|align=center|3
|align=center|5:00
|Mumbai, India
|
|-
|Win
|align=center|1–0
|Sanjeet Budhwar
|Decision (unanimous)
|Matrix Fight Night 2
|
|align=center|3
|align=center|5:00
|New Delhi, India
|
|}

See also 
 List of current UFC fighters
 List of male mixed martial artists 
 Sport in India

References

External links
 
 

1995 births
 People from Dehradun
Living people
Indian male mixed martial artists
Sportspeople from Uttarakhand
Mixed mixed martial artists from Uttarakhand
People from Uttarkashi district
Ultimate Fighting Championship male fighters